The 1997 Illinois Fighting Illini football team represented the University of Illinois at Urbana–Champaign during the 1997 Big Ten Conference football season. They participated as members of the Big Ten Conference. Their home games were played at Memorial Stadium in Champaign, Illinois. The team's head coach was Ron Turner, who was in his first season with the Illini.  Illinois had a winless record of 0–11 and failed to make a bowl game.

Schedule

References

Illinois
Illinois Fighting Illini football seasons
College football winless seasons
Illinois Fighting Illini football